Michele Cortegiani (Palermo, February 8, 1857 - Tunisia, 1928) was an Italian painter, mainly of seascapes of his native Sicily and later Tunisia, and of female portraits and genre subjects.

Biography

He trained with Francesco Lojacono, moving with him to Paris in 1877–1881.

He assisted with the ceiling decoration (1893-1897) of the Teatro Massimo of Palermo, where he worked alongside Luigi Di Giovanni  and Ettore De Maria Bergler, working under the direction of Rocco Lentini. Lentini's concept for the ceiling (pictured) was that of a large wheel with gilded spokes which would contrast with the azure background. Within each spoke, (panels known as petals) feature angels and female figures with musical instruments painted on canvas, while the centrepiece was an allegory of the 'Triumph of Music'.

In later years, he worked in Tunisia, and in Sicily, along with Lojacono, Michele Catti and other painters of their school, where the group became known as the "masters of colour" because of the way they captured the light of the marinas and sleepy villages of Sicily.

See also

 List of Orientalist artists
 Orientalism

References

1857 births
1928 deaths
19th-century Italian painters
Italian male painters
20th-century Italian painters
Italian landscape painters
Painters from Palermo
Orientalist painters
19th-century Italian male artists
20th-century Italian male artists